John Wellesley Flood (3 November 1883 in Yorketown, South Australia, Australia – 21 March 1929 in Rabaul, New Britain, Papua New Guinea) was an Australian-born Irish cricketer. A right-handed batsman and right-arm fast-medium bowler, he played just once for the Ireland cricket team, in a first-class match against Scotland in July 1909.

References

1883 births
1929 deaths
Australian cricketers
Ireland cricketers